The 2017 Foster Farms Bowl was an American college football bowl game played on December 27, 2017, at Levi's Stadium in Santa Clara, California. It was one of the 2017–18 bowl games concluding the 2017 FBS football season. The 16th edition of the Foster Farms Bowl, the game featured the Arizona Wildcats from the Pac-12 Conference against the Purdue Boilermakers from the Big Ten Conference. It was sponsored by the Foster Farms poultry company.

Team selection
The game features conference tie-ins with teams from the Pac-12 Conference and the Big Ten Conference.

Arizona

The Wildcats finished their regular season 7–5 and accepted an invitation to play in the Foster Farms Bowl. This was Arizona's first trip to the Foster Farms Bowl; they entered the game with a record of 9–10–1 in prior bowl appearances.  Their last bowl win was at the 2015 New Mexico Bowl, when they defeated New Mexico 45–37.

Purdue

After finishing their season 6–6, the Boilermakers received an invitation to play in the Foster Farms Bowl, which they accepted. This bowl marked the Boilermakers' eighteenth bowl appearance (they were 9–8 in prior bowl games) and they were seeking their first bowl victory since the 2011 Little Caesars Pizza Bowl, when they beat Western Michigan 37–32.

Game summary

Scoring summary

Statistics

References

External links
 Game summary at ESPN

2017–18 NCAA football bowl games
2017
2017
2017
2017 in sports in California
December 2017 sports events in the United States